Leo August "Lee" Dressen (July 23, 1889 – June 30, 1931) was a Major League Baseball first baseman.

External links

1889 births
1931 deaths
Major League Baseball first basemen
St. Louis Cardinals players
Detroit Tigers players
Baseball players from Kansas
Larned Wheat Kings players
Lyons Lions players
Salt Lake City Skyscrapers players
St. Paul Saints (AA) players